Hannele's Journey to Heaven (German: Hanneles Himmelfahrt) is a 1922 German silent film directed by Urban Gad and starring Margarete Schlegel, Margarete Schön and Hermann Vallentin. The film is based on the play, The Assumption of Hannele by Gerhart Hauptmann. It was remade as a sound film in 1934.

Plot
It is set in a small mountain village and tells the story of Hannele, an unhappy girl who is beaten by her stepfather and tries to commit suicide.

Cast
Margarete Schlegel as Hannele Mattern  
Margarete Schön as Johanna, Hannele's mother  
Hermann Vallentin as Mattern  
Theodor Loos as Teacher Gottwald  
Ernst Dernburg as Berger  
Hermine Sterler as Frau Berger  
Esther Hagan as Martha  
Fritz Richard as Heiber  
Walter Rilla as Angel of Death 
Hugo Döblin as Schmidt  
Emil Heyse as Dr. Wachler  
Maria Forescu 
Klaus Pohl

References

External links

Films of the Weimar Republic
Films directed by Urban Gad
German silent feature films
German films based on plays
Films based on works by Gerhart Hauptmann
German black-and-white films
Terra Film films